Christian Veilleux (born June 28, 2002) is a Canadian American football quarterback for the Pittsburgh Panthers. He formerly played for the Penn State Nittany Lions.

College career

Penn State
Veilleux became the first Canadian quarterback to play for a Power Five school in 16 years when he decided to play for Penn State. Veilleux spent 2021 as Sean Clifford's backup. On November 29, 2022, Veilleux announced he had entered the transfer portal.

Pittsburgh
On December 18, 2022, Veilleux announced his commitment to Pittsburgh.

References

External links
 Penn State Nittany Lions bio

2002 births
Living people
Canadian expatriate American football people in the United States
Penn State Nittany Lions football players
Sportspeople from Ottawa